Laopan is a Loloish language of northern Laos. It is spoken in Bun Tay District, Phongsaly Province, Laos, including in Phaophumuang village (Kingsada 1999).

References

Further reading
Kingsadā, Thō̜ngphet, and Tadahiko Shintani. 1999. Basic Vocabularies of the Languages Spoken in Phongxaly, Lao P.D.R. Tokyo: Institute for the Study of Languages and Cultures of Asia and Africa (ILCAA).

Wright, Pamela Sue. n.d. Singsali (Phunoi) Speech Varieties Of Phongsali Province. ms.

Southern Loloish languages
Languages of Laos